The Fray, an American rock band from Colorado, has released four studio albums, three live albums, one compilation album, five extended plays, twelve singles, one promotional single and ten music videos. The members of the group met in a music store in Denver – independently, positive coverage from many local media outlets brought them to the attention of Epic Records, who signed them in 2004. The Fray's debut studio album, How to Save a Life, was released in 2005. Five singles were released from the album in total: the first two, "Over My Head (Cable Car)" and the album's title track, both reached the top ten of the US Billboard Hot 100 and were certified triple platinum by the Recording Industry Association of America (RIAA): the latter also topped the Irish singles chart and reached number 4 in the United Kingdom.

The Fray's second album, The Fray featured production from Aaron Johnson, Mike Flynn and Engineering from Warren Huart. After its release in February 2009, The Fray became their first album to top the US Billboard 200, and also reached the top ten of the Canadian and United Kingdom albums charts. Its release was preceded by the release of the single "You Found Me", which reached number 7 on the Billboard Hot 100 and was also certified triple platinum by the RIAA. It also achieved success in Australia, where it topped the singles chart and was certified double platinum by the Australian Recording Industry Association (ARIA). Three further singles – "Never Say Never", a cover of the Kanye West song "Heartless" and "Syndicate" – were also released from the album.

In 2012, The Fray released their third album, named Scars & Stories, inspired by a series of trips they took to Rwanda and Germany. The title comes from an unreleased B-side previously recorded by the group. It charted at number 4 on the Billboard 200 and at number 6 in Canada, and spawned two singles: "Heartbeat", which reached number 42 on the Billboard Hot 100, and "Run for Your Life".

Albums

Studio albums

Live albums

Compilation albums

Extended plays

Singles

Promotional singles

Other charted songs

Guest appearances

Music videos

Notes

References

External links 
 Official website
 
 

Rock music group discographies
Discographies of American artists